In geometry, Stewart's theorem yields a relation between the lengths of the sides and the length of a cevian in a triangle. Its name is in honour of the Scottish mathematician Matthew Stewart, who published the theorem in 1746.

Statement 

Let  be the length of a cevian to the side of length .

A common mnemonic used by students to memorize this equation (after rearranging the terms) is:

The theorem may be written more symmetrically using signed lengths of segments.

In the special case that the cevian is the median (that is, it divides the opposite side into two segments of equal length), the result is known as Apollonius' theorem.

Proof 
The theorem can be proved as an application of the law of cosines.

Applying the law of cosines in the two small triangles using angles  and  produces

One obtains

which is the required equation.

The left and right hand sides of the equation then reduce algebraically to the same expression.

History

See also 
 Mass point geometry

Notes

References

Further reading
 I.S Amarasinghe, Solutions to the Problem 43.3: Stewart's Theorem (A New Proof for the Stewart's Theorem using Ptolemy's Theorem), Mathematical Spectrum, Vol 43(03), pp. 138 – 139, 2011.

External links
 
 

Euclidean plane geometry
Theorems about triangles
Articles containing proofs